Actinopus xenus is a species of mygalomorph spiders in the family Actinopodidae. It is found in South America.

References

xenus
Spiders described in 1917